The list of ship launches in 1696 includes a chronological list of some ships launched in 1696.


References

1696
Ship launches